Donji Svilaj is a village in the Odžak municipality, Posavina Canton, Bosnia and Herzegovina.

Demographics 
According to the 1991 census, the settlement had 1576 inhabitants.

According to the 2013 census, its population was 1,107.

Sport 
Donji Svilaj is the home of HNK Mladost.

References 

Populated places in Odžak
Cities and towns in the Federation of Bosnia and Herzegovina